KOCN (105.1 FM) is a Rhythmic AC station licensed to Salinas, California. It has been owned by iHeartMedia, Inc. (formerly Clear Channel Media and Entertainment) since 1997.  Its studios are in Salinas, and the transmitter is just east of Monterey.

The station was first licensed April 28, 1978. KOCN was purchased in 1986 by Roger and Cheryl Pasquier for $1 million dollars. It had no ratings and The amount paid for the station was considered stick value. The Pasquiers then change the format to an adult contemporary music station and rose to #4 in the Arbitron rankings for adults  #2 in women.  In August 1995 K-Ocean 105 moved from 104.9 MHz to 105.1 MHz And changed its format to oldies. The ratings went from number #4 to #1 in the market. In 1997 the station was sold to Clear Channel Communications for approximately $7 million dollars cash including cash and accounts receivables.  Its current format is described in its slogan as "The Central Coast's Greatest Throwbacks".

References

External links

OCN
Rhythmic adult contemporary radio stations
Radio stations established in 1978
1978 establishments in California
IHeartMedia radio stations